The Internet Social Forum emerged from the World Social Forum (WSF) as a means to envision the role of the internet in help shape a new world on broadly similar lines to the WSF. It was founded in March 2015 at the Tunis WSF Conference.

Leading voices in its creation were Africa - Alex Gakaru, Asia - Rishab Bailey, Europe - Norbert Bollow, North America - Michael Gurstein and in South America - Sally Burch.

Four demands
Four demands were included in the Tunis Call for a People's Internet:
 "Decisive action to curb the indiscriminate mass surveillance being implemented by corporations, security agencies and governments."
 "Decentralization --to the greatest extent possible-- of the Internet's technical, data and economic structures; and access to a net-neutral Internet, as a right, which would include support for community-owned networks and public infrastructure. We also defend the freedom of people-to-people communication."
 "Harnessing the Internet revolution to build global solidarity among people's movements, and enable them to share their experiences globally and learn from one another."
 "A people's Internet must be driven first and foremost by the people. An Internet driven by big business, hand-in-hand with big government does not represent the public interest. We will defend the right of grassroots organizations and social movements, alongside other civil society actors, to have a seat at any global negotiations on the governance of the Internet."

References

Global policy organizations